Francis Kaphuka or Young Kay (born June 11, 1986) is a popular Malawian hip-hop artist that is known for fusing local Malawian folk songs with international genres. He is known for his vibrant sound and ability to mix Chichewa and English lyrics eloquently in his rhymes. This has earned him recognition as one of Malawi's best lyricists. He has been voted as Malawi’s best rapper twice Joy FM fans and in 2021 was crowned King of Malawian Hiphop by the audience of one of Malawi's biggest online platforms, Mikozi Networks. He was introduced to Malawian audiences under Rush records with the single “I’m Home” and his popularity grew to solidify his place as one of Malawi's greatest hip-hop artists. He has had subsequent hits since then. His song “zipepese” number 2 on FM 101 Power’s urban music chart. In 2010 he collaborated with Malawian born rising act Onesimus Muzik on a track titled "Beautiful" He also collaborated with Lucius Banda, Tigris, and Maskal on track "Malawi Goodlife" in 2011.

Discography
Exhale (album) - 2007
First Impression (album) - 2009
Pauchidolo (Mixtape) - 2012

TV Appearances
 Big Brother Africa, 2010

Accolades
 Hip Hop Honors, 2011

References

21st-century Malawian male singers
Living people
1986 births